is a 26-episode Japanese anime television series, which first aired on Fuji TV between October 7, 1968 and March 31, 1969, on its 19:30–20:00 timeslot.

The series was later remade into a second anime television series, which premiered in April 2006 in Japan on Animax, featuring a new cast, with a total of 26 episodes also produced.

A live-action television drama adaptation premiered on NTV on October 22, 2011. A film was released on December 15, 2012.

For the series' 50th anniversary, a third anime television series adaptation titled BEM was confirmed to be in production. The third series aired from July 14 to October 13, 2019. A new film titled BEM: Become Human, was released on October 2, 2020. It streamed on Funimation's website on October 29, 2020.

A spin-off live-action film Yokai Ningen Bela was released on September 11, 2020.

Plot
The plot of the series revolves around three yokai (supernatural creatures), Bem, Bela and Belo, who arrive at a large coastal city and come across an evil atmosphere, which was brought about by immoral behavior by humans and mischief caused by monsters and yokai. They therefore decide to stay in the city, fighting against other monsters and yokai which attack humans, making a few friends along the way. Even though the three yokai are often abused and discriminated against by other human beings due to their appearance, they still strive in protecting the human populace of the city from other monsters, one day hoping to become human beings in return for their good actions.

Characters
 Bem
 
 Played by: Kazuya Kamenashi
 Protagonist The oldest looking of the trio is the leader. He uses a walking stick as a weapon in human form.

 Bela

 Played by: Anne Watanabe
 The only female in the group and the most bad-tempered of the trio. She uses a whip as a weapon in human form.

 Belo

 Played by: Fuku Suzuki
 The youngest looking and the most naive of the trio. He is the only one that does not use a weapon in human form.

Staff

Original series
Original Concept: Akira Adachi
Screenplay: Akira Adachi
Directors: Noburo Ishiguro, Tadao Wakabayashi
Art: Shin Morikawa
Production: Daiichi Doga (later incorporated into ADK)

Cast
Bem: Kiyoshi Kobayashi
Bela: Hiroko Mori
Belo: Mari Shimizu
Opening Narration: Tatsuya Jo, Issei Futamata (Part 2)

Theme songs
Opening:  (lyrics: Daiichi Doga, composition and arrangement: Seishi Tanaka; performance: Honey Nights)
Ending:  (lyrics: Daiichi Doga Bungei-bu, composition and arrangement: Masahiro Uno, performance: Toshiko Yamada, Otowa Yurikago Kai, Gekidan Komadori)

2006 remake
Original Concept: Asatsu DK
Director: Hiroshi Harada
Series Composition: Junki Takegami
Character Design: Kazuhiko Shibuya
Chief Animation Director: Takeshi Yamazaki
Yokai Design Creator: Naoki Ogiwara
Art Directors: Shō Tensui, Tsutomu Nishikura, Shinji Kawai
Primary Background Artist: Kazue Itō
Color Settings: Miharu Sakai
Director of Photography: Tomofumi Fujita
Editing: Yumiko Nakaba, Hideaki Murai (Okayasu Promotion)
Sound Director: Fusanobu Fujiyama
Sound Supervision: Takanori Ebina
Music: Takehiko Gokita
Animation Production: Studio Comet
Production: NAS
Producers: NAS, Sony Pictures Entertainment, avex entertainment, Studio Comet

Cast
Bem: Kazuhiko Inoue
Bela: Kaori Yamagata
Belo: Ai Horanai
Kira Hyuga: Yūna Inamura
Sora Kaido: Naoya Iwahashi
Mitsuki Kisaragi: Minori Chihara
Genpaku Hyuga: Masami Iwasaki
Urara Hyuga: Mie Sonozaki
Riku Kaido: Ryō Naitō
Umi Kaido: Miki Nagasawa
Ryoko Kisaragi: Yuriko Fuchizaki
Yuzo Mikami: Manabu Murashi
Hitoshi Tamugenro: Hirofumi Nojima
Imp: Mitsuo Iwata
Dana O'Shee: Rokuro Naya
Doppleganger: Hiroyuki Miyasako
Narration: Mizuho Suzuki

Theme songs
Opening:  (Performance: Hiroshi Kitadani (Bem = Kazuhiko Inoue))
Ending:  (Performance: Minako Yoshida)

2019 anime
Original Story: ADK Emotions
Director: Yoshinori Odaka
Series Composition: Atsuhiro Tomioka
Original Character Design: Range Murata
Character Design: Masakazu Sunagawa
Music Composer: Soil & "Pimp" Sessions, Michiru
Music Producer: Flying Dog
Animation Production: LandQ Studios
Planning Production: NAS
Project Collaborator: Production I.G
Production: BEM Production Committee

Cast
Bem: Katsuyuki Konishi/Gabe Kunda
Bela: M.A.O/Dani Chambers
Belo: Kensho Ono/Aaron Dismuke
Mysterious Lady: Maaya Sakamoto/Colleen Clinkenbeard
Joel Woods: Kenji Nomura/Jason Douglas
Sonia Summers: Maaya Uchida/Felecia Angelle
Dr. Recycle: Junichi Suwabe/Daman Mills
Daryl Bryson: Soma Saito/Dallas Reid
Roddy Walker: Koutaro Nishiyama/Stephen Fu
Helmut Felt: Daisuke Ono/Christopher Wehkamp

Theme songs
Opening: "Uchū no Kioku" (Performance: Maaya Sakamoto)
Ending: "Iruimi" (Performance: JUNNA)

2020 film

Original story: ADK Emotions
Director: Hiroshi Ikehata
Series Composition: Atsuhiro Tomioka
Original Character Design: Range Murata
Character Design: Mino Matsumoto
Animation Production: Production I.G

Cast
Bem: Katsuyuki Konishi/Gabe Kunda
Bela: M.A.O/Dani Chambers
Belo: Kensho Ono/Aaron Dismuke
Burgess: Toshiya Miyata/Ryan Colt Levy
Manstoll: Kōichi Yamadera/Jason Liebrecht
Emma: Nana Mizuki/Bryn Apprill
Draco: Wataru Takagi/Michael Schwalbe
Greta: Shizuka Itō/Elizabeth Maxwell

Anime
Funimation has licensed the 2019 series for a simuldub. Due to the Kyoto Animation arson attack on July 18, 2019, Episode 4, which was originally scheduled to air on August 4, 2019, was postponed to August 18, 2019.

Reception
The live-action film grossed US$11.5 million in Japan.

References

External links
 Official site of the remake
Official site of the TV drama 
Animax East Asia's official website for Humanoid Monster Bem

 (2006 series)
 (2019 series)

1968 anime television series debuts
1969 Japanese television series endings
2006 Japanese television series endings
2006 anime television series debuts
2011 Japanese television series debuts
2011 Japanese television series endings
2019 anime television series debuts
Adventure anime and manga
Animax original programming
Anime with original screenplays
Fantasy anime and manga
Fuji TV original programming
Funimation
Horror anime and manga
Japanese animated horror television series
Japanese horror fiction television series
Live-action films based on animated series
Nippon TV dramas
Supernatural anime and manga
TV Tokyo original programming
Yōkai in anime and manga
Japanese supernatural horror films